Tung Chung Development Pier also known as Tung Chung New Development Ferry Pier and Tung Chung New Ferry Pier is a ferry pier in Tung Chung Waterfront Road, Tung Chung, Lantau Island, New Territories, Hong Kong. It was built to replace Tung Chung Old Ferry Pier that is located further west, in Ma Wan Chung.

Ferry service

East Berth 
The former ferry service between Tuen Mun and Tung Chung New Development Ferry Pier (East Berth), operated by New World First Ferry (now known as Sun Ferry), ceased operation on 1 July 2008. It was replaced by KMB bus route E33P between Tuen Mun and the airport via Tung Chung.

West Berth 
There is a ferry service between Tuen Mun and Tai O, via Tung Chung New Development Ferry Pier (West Berth) and Sha Lo Wan, operated by Fortune Ferry.

References

Piers in Hong Kong
Tung Chung